The Vermont Catamounts women's ice hockey program represents the University of Vermont. The Catamounts compete in Hockey East. Their first year of varsity women's hockey was in 1998-99. The Catamounts were in the ECAC at the Division III level of competition. In 2001-02, the Catamounts moved up to Division I. For the 2005-06 season, the Catamounts moved to Hockey East.

History
The Vermont Catamounts women's ice hockey program was launched in 1995-1996, under head coach Bruce Garrapy.

During the 2003-04 season, Kami Cote of Vermont set an NCAA record for most saves in one season with 1332.

During the 2010-11 season, Roxanne Douville earned consecutive shutouts against No. 9 Providence (Jan. 30) and Maine (Feb. 5) establishing a new program record shutout streak of 164 minutes and 13 seconds. In addition, she became only the second Vermont player to be named to the Hockey East All-Rookie Team.

The 2013- 2014 season saw Vermont's best finish, ending the season 18-4-4, and earning fourth place in Hockey East. They won their quarterfinal match-up against Maine with three overtime wins. They advanced to meet Boston College in the semi-finals, losing by a score of 1-3. Catamount head coach Jim Plumer won the Hockey East co-Coach of the Year award and the New England Division I Women's Coach of the Year award.

In 2019-2020, sophomore defenceman Maude Poulin-Labelle set the team's record for points by a defenseman in a single season, with 12 goals and 17 assists, for 29 points. Her goals total tied for first among Catamount defensemen. She was Hockey East player of the Week on January 6, 2020. She was nominated for the Patty Kazmaier Memorial Award, and earned a spot on the Hockey East All Star Third Team. The Catamounts started the season on a four game unbeaten streak, and lost just 2 games in their first 12 matches. They made the Hockey East tournament for the eighth consecutive year, but fell to the eventual tournament winners, the Northeastern Huskies, in the quarterfinals.

On November 11, 2020, Hockey East announced the 2020-2021 schedule for men's and women's ice hockey. League play had been postponed due to the ongoing COVID-19 pandemic in the United States, which caused the cancellation of the 2020 NCAA women's ice hockey tournament.  Beginning on November 20, women's hockey resumes in a round robin format with each team playing 18 games, to determine the regular season champion. Flex weekends are planned to allow for canceled matches to be played as needed.

During the 2021-2022 season, the Catamounts were ranked for the first time in program history at #10 in the USCHO poll on January 31, 2022. They were ranked at #10 in the USA Hockey poll on February 22, 2022 for the first time ever. They also set a program record of 22 wins in a season.

Year by year

Roster
As of September 26, 2022.

Player stats

Career points

All-Time Leaders Goaltending

*Current member of the team and stats as of March 2023

Awards and honors

AWCHA honors

ECAC honors

Hockey East honors

Hockey Humanitarian Award 

 2003- Jenny Agnew, Nominee
 2005- Kami Cote, Nominee
 2006- Abby Kaknes, Nominee
 2014- Danielle Rancourt, Finalist

Sarah Devens Award 

 2018- Taylor Willard

National Strength & Conditioning All-American 

 2006- Gabe Worzella
 2007- Kristen Norris

New England Hockey Writers Division l All-Star 

 2013- Roxanne Douville
 2014- Roxanne Douville
 2014- Amanda Pelkey

New England Division l Women's Coach of the Year 

 2014- Jim Plumer
 2017- Jim Plumer

Patty Kazmaier Memorial Award 

 2020- Maude Poulin-Labelle, Nominee
 2022- Theresa Schafzahl, Top 10 Finalist

University of Vermont Athletic Hall of Fame 

 2013- Tiffany Hayes
 2015- Kami Cote

Division I CCM/AHCA All-Americans 

 2022- Theresa Schafzahl, First Team
 2022- Maude Poulin-Labelle, Second Team

All-USCHO Teams 

 2022- Theresa Schafzahl, Second Team

Records

Career records

*Current member of the team and stats as of March 2023

Single season records

*Current member of the team and stats as of March 2023

Single Game records

Single Game individual records

Single game team records

Catamounts in professional hockey

Olympians 

Chelsea Rapin, who played for the team from 2008-2012, was a referee for the women's tournament in the 2022 Winter Olympics.

International Players

References

External links
Vermont Catamounts women's ice hockey

 
Ice hockey teams in Vermont
1995 establishments in Vermont
Ice hockey clubs established in 1995